Elizabeth Stuart may refer to:

Members of the royal House of Stuart
Elizabeth Stuart, Countess of Lennox (1555–1582), mother of Arabella Stuart
Elizabeth Stuart, 2nd Countess of Moray (1565–1591), daughter of James Stewart, 1st Earl of Moray and Agnes Keith
Elizabeth Stuart, Queen of Bohemia (1596–1662), daughter of James VI/I of Scotland and England
Elizabeth Stuart (1610–1674), daughter of Esmé Stewart, 3rd Duke of Lennox
Elizabeth Stuart (daughter of Charles I) (1635–1650), daughter of Charles I of England and Scotland
Elizabeth Stuart (daughter of James II) (1678–1678/1679), daughter of James II/VII of England and Scotland and Mary of Modena

Other people 
Elizabeth Stuart (theologian) (born 1963), British theologian
Elizabeth A. Stuart, professor of mental health and biostatistics
Liz Stuart (born 1960), voice actress from Happy Tree Friends

See also
Elizabeth Stuart Phelps Ward (1844–1911), feminist American author and intellectual
Eliza Stewart (disambiguation)
Elizabeth Stewart (disambiguation)